The men's long jump event was part of the track and field athletics programme at the 1936 Summer Olympics. The competition was held on August 4, 1936. Forty-three athletes from 27 nations competed. The maximum number of athletes per nation had been set at 3 since the 1930 Olympic Congress. The final was won by American Jesse Owens. It was the United States' fourth consecutive and ninth overall gold medal in the event; it was also Owens's second of four gold medals in the 1936 Games. Luz Long won Germany's first medal in the event with silver; Naoto Tajima put Japan on the podium for the second Games in a row with bronze.

Jesse Owens and Luz Long

The competition between Owens and Long resulted in a story of friendship, possibly embellished into mythology. Both men were accomplished long jumpers going into the Games, with Owens holding the world record and Long holding the European record. Owens, however, fouled in his first two jumps in the qualifying round; he needed a successful jump, of at least 7.15 metres, to advance to the semifinal round.

In the 1964 documentary Jesse Owens Returns to Berlin, Owens relates a story that Long came over to offer advice before Owens's third jump. According to the story, Long said that Owens should jump from a few inches before the takeoff board. This would reduce the measured distance but avoid the risk of another fault; the theory was that Owens would still clear the required distance even with the handicap of jumping early. However, this conversation may be apocryphal; Grantland Rice was watching Owens the entirety of the qualifying round and did not see him speak to Long. Tom Ecker relates that he asked Owens about the story in 1965 and Owens admitted that it was not true, but just a good story.

In any case, Owens successfully made his third jump at 7.64 metres, advancing to the semifinal round. He and Long each beat the old Olympic record of 7.765 metres multiple times in the semifinal and final rounds. Owens finished with a best jump of 8.06 metres to Long's 7.87 metres. Now, if not before, the two met and became friends: Long was the first to congratulate Owens, embracing the African-American in front of Adolf Hitler. The two men corresponded after the Games until the Nazi officer was murdered in the Biscari massacre. Owens later was the best man at the wedding of Long's son.

Background

This was the 10th appearance of the event, which is one of 12 athletics events to have been held at every Summer Olympics. The only returning jumper from the 1932 Games was sixth-place finisher Naoto Tajima of Japan. Jesse Owens was the world record holder and heavy favorite.

Afghanistan, the Republic of China, Peru, the Philippines, Romania, and Yugoslavia each made their first appearance in the event. The United States appeared for the 10th time, the only nation to have long jumpers at each of the Games thus far.

Competition format

The 1936 competition used a three-round format, quite different from previous iterations. For the qualifying round, each jumper had three attempts to reach the required distance of 7.15 metres. Every jumper who achieved that result in qualifying advanced to the semifinal round. There, each jumper had three jumps. The six men with the best jumps in the semifinal advanced to the final, where they received an additional three jumps; any of the six jumps from the semifinal or final would count for the final score, but not the qualifying round jumps.

Records

These were the standing world and Olympic records (in metres) prior to the 1928 Summer Olympics.

(*) Robert LeGendre set the Olympic record in the 1924 pentathlon contest

Jesse Owens broke the Olympic record with his second jump in the final round, at 7.87 metres. Luz Long matched that with his fifth, penultimate jump (after also breaking the older record at 7.84 metres on his third), but Owens finished with 7.94 metres and 8.06 metres in his fifth and sixth jumps. However, all of these jumps were wind-aided.

Schedule

Results

Qualifying

Semifinal and Final

References

Athletics at the 1936 Summer Olympics
Long jump at the Olympics
Men's events at the 1936 Summer Olympics